Violaceae is a family of flowering plants established in 1802, consisting of about 1000 species in about 25 genera. It takes its name from the genus Viola,  the violets and pansies.

Older classifications such as the Cronquist system placed the Violaceae in an order named after it, the Violales or the Parietales. However, molecular phylogeny studies place the family in the Malpighiales as reflected in the Angiosperm Phylogeny Group (APG) classification, with 41 other families, where it is situated in the parietal clade of 11 families. Most of the species are found in three large genera, Viola, Rinorea and Hybanthus. The other genera are largely monotypic or oligotypic. The genera are grouped into four clades within the family. The species are largely tropical or subtropical but Viola has a number of species in temperate regions. Many genera have a very restricted distribution.

Description

Though the best-known genus, Viola, is herbaceous, most species are shrubs, lianas or small trees. The simple leaves are alternate or opposite, often with leafy stipules or the stipules are reduced in size. Some species have palmate or deeply dissected leaves. Many species are acaulescent. The flower are solitary in panicles. Some species have cleistogamous flowers produced after or before the production of typical flowers with petals. Flowers are bisexual or unisexual (e.g. Melicytus), actinomorphic but typically zygomorphic with a calyx of five sepals that are persistent after flowering. Corollae have five mostly unequal petals, and the anterior petal is larger and often spurred. Plants have five stamens with the abaxial stamen often spurred at the base. The gynoecium is a compound pistil of three united carpels with one locule.  Styles are simple, with the ovary superior and containing many ovules. The fruits are capsules split by way of three seams.  Seeds have endosperm.

Taxonomy 

That Viola, previously included by Jussieu (1789) under Cisti, should have its own family was first proposed by Ventenat in 1799, and in 1803 placed the Viola species in a new genus, Ionidium which he described as "Famille des violettes." However, in the meantime Batsch established the Violaceae, as a suprageneric rank under the name of Violariae (1802), and as the first formal description, bears his name as the botanical authority. Batsch included eight genera in this family. Although Violariae continued to be used by some authors, such as Don (1831) and Bentham and Hooker (1862) (as Violarieae), most authors, such as Engler (1895), adopted the alternative name Violaceae, proposed by de Lamarck and de Candolle in 1805, and later by Gingins (1823) and Saint-Hilaire (1824). With the establishment of higher suprafamiliar orders, which he called "Alliances", Lindley (1853) placed his Violaceae within the Violales.

Phylogeny 

Historically, Violaceae has been placed within a number of orders since Lindley's treatment, principally Violales (Hutchinson, Takhtajan, Cronquist, Thorne) and the equivalent Parietales (Bentham and Hooker, Engler and Prantl, Melchior), although such placement was considered unsatisfactory, but also Polygalinae (Hallier) and Guttiferales (Bessey). Of these, that of Melchior (1925), within the Engler and Prantl system, has been considered one of the most influential. Molecular phylogenetics resulted in the Angiosperm Phylogeny Group (APG) places it as one of a large number of families within the eudicot order Malpighiales. Violaceae, as one of 42 families, is placed in a clade of 10 families within the order. Its place within the parietal clade reflects its earlier position in Parietales, those families with parietal placentation. There it forms a sister group to Goupiaceae.

Subdivision

History 

The Violaceae are a medium sized family with about 22–28 genera, and about 1,000–1,100 species. Most of the genera are monotypic or oligotypic, but the three genera Viola (about 600 species), Rinorea (about 250 species), and Hybanthus include 98% of the species with about half the species in Viola, and more than three-quarters of the remainder in the other two genera.

Many attempts have been made at an intrafamilial classification, but these have largely been artificial, based on floral characteristics. Subdivisions were recognized almost immediately.  Early classifications identified two major divisions, that were followed by most taxonomists;
 Alsodeieae. (Alsodineae, Rinoreeae). Radially symmetrical flowers (actinomorphic)
 Violeae. Bilaterally symmetrical flowers (zygomorphic)

These also had biogeographical correlation, with the latter being almost exclusively South American and African, and the former being distributed in Europe in addition to the Americas. In contrast, Bentham and Hooker (and some others) divided Alsodeieae, giving three tribes;
 Violeae. Strictly zygomorphic
 Paypayroleae. Actinomorphic wth some zygomorphic features
 Alsodeieae. Strictly actinomorphic

Melchior utilized a more complex classification with two subfamilies, tribes and subtribes to recognize the place of Leonia within the Violaceae;.
 Subfamily Violoideae
 Tribe Rinoreeae
 Subtribe Rinoreinae (Rinorea, Allexis, Gloeospermum)
 Subtribe Hymenantherina (Melicytus, Hymenanthera)
 Subtribe Isodendriinae (Isodendrion)
 Subtribe Paypayrolinae (Amphirrhox, Paypayrola)
 Tribe Violeae
 Subtribe Hybanthinae (Hybanthus, Agatea)
 Subtribe Violinae (Anchietea, Corynostylis, Schweiggeria, Noisettia, Viola)
 Subfamily Leonioideae (Leonia)

The historical subdivisions shown here are those of the system of Hekking (1988), based largely on floral symmetry, petal aestivation and petal morphology. In this system, most genera occur in the Rinoreae and Violeae tribes. Three subfamilies have been recognized: the Violoideae, Leonioideae, and Fusispermoideae.

Subfamily Fusispermoideae 

Fusispermum Cuatrec.

Subfamily Leonioideae 
Leonia Ruiz & Pav.

Subfamily Violoideae

Tribe Rinoreeae

Subtribe Hymenantherinae 

Hymenanthera R.Br.
Melicytus J.R.Forst. & G.Forst.

Subtribe Isodendriinae 

Isodendrion A.Gray

Subtribe Paypayrolinae 

Amphirrhox Spreng.
Paypayrola Aubl. (including Hekkingia J. K. Munzinger & H.E.Ballard)

Subtribe Rinoreinae 

Allexis Pierre
Decorsella A.Chev. (including Gymnorinorea Keay)
Gloeospermum Triana & Planch.
Rinorea Aubl. (including Alsodeia Thouars, Phyllanoa Croizat, Scyphellandra Thwaites)
Rinoreocarpus Ducke

Tribe Violeae 

About 600 species, in the following genera, but mainly in Viola  and Hybanthus and including all four of the lianescent genera in the family (Agatea, Anchietea, Calyptrion and Hybanthopsis;
 Anchietea A.St.-Hil.
 Corynostylis Mart. (including Agatea A.Gray and Agation Brongn. and a synonym of Calyptrion)
 Hybanthopsis Paula-Souza
 Hybanthus Jacq. (included Acentra Phil., Clelandia J.M.Black, Cubelium Raf. ex Britton & A.Br., Ionidium Vent., Pigea DC.)
 Mayanaea Lundell
 Noisettia Kunth
 Orthion Standl. & Steyerm.
 Pombalia Vand.
 Schweiggeria Spreng.
 Viola  L. (including Erpetion Sweet, Mnemion Spach)

Molecular systems 

Molecular phylogenetic studies have revealed that many of these divisions were not monophyletic, partly due to homoplasy. These studies demonstrate four major clades within the family.

The molecularly defined subdivisions are;
 Clade 1: Viola, Schweiggeria, Noisettia, Allexis
 Clade 2: Paypayrola, Hekkingia
 Clade 3: Leonia, Gloeospermum, Amphirrhox, Orthion, Mayanaea, Hybanthus concolor, the Hybanthus havanensis Group, and the Hybanthus caledonicus Group
 Clade 4: largely unresolved

In Clade 1, Schweiggeria and Noisettia are monotypic and form a sister group to Viola. In addition to the major clades, there were a number of unplaced segregates.

Etymology 

The family derives its name from the nominative genus, Viola.

Distribution and habitat 

The Violaceae have an overall cosmopolitan distribution, but are essentially tropical and subtropical, with the exception of the numerous Northern Hemisphere temperate species of Viola, the largest genus, which is also occurs at higher altitudes in its tropical and subtropical regions, where the shrub, tree and lianescent species are concentrated. In those regions, most representative genera are the mainly woody Rinorea and Hybanthus. While Viola, Hybanthus, and Rinorea are widely distributed in both hemispheres, the remaining genera are relatively restricted in their distribution. Some are restricted to a single continent while others have a limited area involving just a single archipelago. About 70 species are found in Brazil.

 Allexis, tropical West Africa
 Amphirrhox, Anchietea, Gloeospermum, Leonia, Noisettia, Paypayrola, tropical South America
 Corynostylis, Schweiggeria, tropical Central and South America
 Melicytus, New Zealand and nearby islands
 Hymenanthera, Australia and New Zealand
 Agatea, New Caledonia, New Guinea, and the Fiji Islands
 Isodendrion, Sandwich Islands and Hawaii

References

Bibliography

Books and theses 

 
 
 
 
 
 
 

Historical sources

Articles

Websites

External links 

 
Malpighiales families
Taxa named by August Batsch